Kürten  is a German surname and the name of a village in North Rhine-Westphalia, Germany, Kürten. Notable people with the surname include:

David Kurten (born 1971), British politician
Dieter Kürten, German journalist
Gustavo Kuerten (born 1976), Brazilian tennis player
Hans Peter Kürten, mayor of Remagen
Jessica Kürten (1969–), Irish equestrian
Peter Kürten (1883–1931), German serial killer, The Vampire of Düsseldorf
Dedicated to Peter Kürten, 1981 album by Whitehouse